Mezorhizoglyphus is a genus of mites in the family Acaridae.

Species
 Mezorhizoglyphus bratskensis Klimov, 1996
 Mezorhizoglyphus colchicus Kadzhaya, 1966

References

Acaridae